Dry Hill and Dryhill may refer to:

Dryhill, village in Kent 
Dry Hill, nature preserve in Massachusetts
Dry Hill, Illinois, an unincorporated community
Dry Hill, West Virginia, an unincorporated community in Raleigh County
Dryhill, Kentucky